Zeno X is an art gallery, directed by Frank Demaegd, of mainly figurative painting within the contemporary art in Antwerp, Belgium.

Artists
Artists represented by the gallery include:
 Michaël Borremans, painter and filmmaker
 Dirk Braeckman, photographer
 Raoul De Keyser
 Stan Douglas, installation and video artist
 Marlene Dumas
 Mark Manders, installation - sculptor
 Jenny Scobel, painter
 Luc Tuymans 
 Anne-Mie Van Kerckhoven, multi-media artist
 Jack Whitten

References

External links 
 
zeno x at art basel miami
zeno x t the armory show
zeno x at frieze art fair london 

Contemporary art galleries in Belgium
Museums in Antwerp